Kottarakara or Kottarakkara is a legislative assembly constituency in Kollam district of Kerala, India. It is one among the 11 assembly constituencies in Kollam district. As of the 2016 assembly elections, the current MLA is K N Balagopal of CPI(M).

Structure
As per the recent changes on assembly constituency delimitations, the Kottarakara assembly constituency consists of the municipality of Kottarakkara and 7 neighbouring panchayaths including Ezhukone, Kareepra, Kulakkada, Mylom, Neduvathoor, veliyam and Ummannoor.

 Municipalities: Kottarakara
 Panchayaths: Ezhukone, Kareepra, Kulakkada, Mylom, Neduvathoor, Ummannoor,veliyam
 Neighbourhood Towns: Thrikkannamangal, Kunnicode, Valakom, Odanavattam

Electoral history

Travancore-Cochin Legislative Assembly Elections

Members of Legislative Assembly 
The following list contains all members of Kerala legislative assembly who have represented the constituency:

Key

* indicates bypolls

Election results 
Percentage change (±%) denotes the change in the number of votes from the immediate previous election.

Niyamasabha Election 2021 
There were 2,00,587 registered voters in the constituency for the 2021 Kerala Niyamasabha Election.

Niyamasabha Election 2016 
There were 2,00,527 registered voters in the constituency for the 2016 Kerala Niyamasabha Election.

Niyamasabha Election 2011 
There were 1,84,97 registered voters in the constituency for the 2011 election.

References

Assembly constituencies of Kerala
Government of Kollam
Politics of Kollam district
Assembly constituencies in Kollam district
1957 establishments in Kerala
Constituencies established in 1957